The surname Ursini may refer to:

 Fulvio Orsini or Fulvius Ursini (11 December 1529 – 18 May 1600), an Italian humanist, historian, and archaeologist
 James Ursini (born 1947), a teacher and writer living in Los Angeles
 Toma Ursini (early-17th century), an Archbishop of Antivari, Montenegro

See also
 Ursini (disambiguation)